Matthew Carter (born 11 September 2000) is an Australian diver. He participated at the 2019 World Aquatics Championships, winning a medal.

References

2000 births
Living people
Australian male divers
Sportspeople from Adelaide
World Aquatics Championships medalists in diving
Divers at the 2018 Commonwealth Games
Commonwealth Games bronze medallists for Australia
Commonwealth Games medallists in diving
Divers at the 2018 Summer Youth Olympics
21st-century Australian people
Medallists at the 2018 Commonwealth Games